Travis Hunter Jr. (born May 18, 2003) is an American football cornerback and wide receiver for the Colorado Buffaloes. He previously played for the Jackson State Tigers. A consensus five-star recruit in high school, he made headlines in December 2021 when he committed to Jackson State, becoming the highest-ranked prospect to ever commit to an HBCU or FCS program.

High school career
A native of West Palm Beach, Florida, Hunter moved to Georgia as an eighth grader. He attended Collins Hill High School in Suwanee, Georgia, where he played cornerback and wide receiver for the Eagles. As a sophomore, he led the county with seven interceptions while recording 49 receptions for 919 yards and 12 touchdowns. As a junior, Hunter made eight interceptions and 51 tackles in addition to catching 137 passes for 1,746 yards and 24 touchdowns, earning MaxPreps Georgia Player of the Year honors. He also set Gwinnett County single-season records in receptions, receiving yards and receiving touchdowns, leading the Eagles to a 12–3 record and an appearance in the Class 7A state title game.

As a senior, Hunter recorded 76 receptions for 1,128 yards and 10 touchdowns on offense and 23 tackles, four interceptions and a forced fumble on defense, even after missing five games due to a mid-season ankle injury. In the state title game, he made 10 catches for 153 yards and a touchdown, as well as a forced fumble, to cap off a perfect 15–0 record and Collins Hill's first state championship in school history. In his final high school game, Hunter made 10 catches for 178 yards and two touchdowns in their 40–36 defeat to Washington state champs Graham-Kapowsin in the GEICO State Championship Bowl Series. He also broke the Georgia state record in career receiving touchdowns, previously held by Braxton Hicks, with 48.

Hunter was selected to play in the 2022 Polynesian Bowl, where he won Offensive MVP honors after recording five receptions for 54 yards, in addition to an interception on defense.

Recruiting
Hunter was considered the number one overall recruit by both 247Sports.com and Rivals.com, as well as number two by ESPN (behind Walter Nolen). After having received a scholarship from Florida State in November 2019, he committed to the Seminoles on March 3, 2020, one day after making his first visit to the school. He made his choice over offers from Alabama, Auburn, Clemson, Florida, Georgia, Michigan and Oklahoma, among others.

On December 15, 2021, Hunter flipped his commitment to the Jackson State Tigers coached by Deion Sanders, a Florida State alum, in an unprecedented move. He had visited the school the month before, attending their sellout Soul Bowl victory on November 20. As the number one recruit in the nation, Hunter became the first five-star recruit to ever sign with a HBCU or an FCS program. Dustin Lewis of Sports Illustrated called it "probably the most shocking decision in the history of college football recruiting" while Steve Wiltfong, the national director of recruiting for 247Sports.com, said it was "the biggest signing day moment in the history of college football".

College career

2022 
Hunter recorded two receiving touchdowns and two interceptions in the Jackson State spring game, which was the first HBCU spring game to ever be nationally televised.

Hunter recorded his first collegiate touchdown as well as his first interception against Alabama A&M on November 12, 2022.

As a freshman, Hunter accumulated 15 total tackles, nine pass breakups, two interceptions, one fumble recovery and one defensive touchdown in seven games played. On offense, he added 14 receptions for 141 yards and two touchdowns.

With Deion Sanders departing Jackson State for the head coaching position at the University of Colorado, it was widely reported that Hunter would likely follow Sanders to the program. On December 19, Hunter entered the transfer portal. He officially announced his transfer to Colorado two days later.

Personal life
Hunter's father, Travis Sr., starred on the football and track teams at Boynton Beach Community High School. He went on to play semipro football in the Florida Football Alliance and the Southern States Football League, winning the latter's Offensive Rookie of the Year award in 2007.

Social media and endorsements
On February 16, 2022, it was announced that Hunter signed a Name, Image and Likeness (NIL) deal with J5 Caffe, a Black-owned coffee company based in Columbus, Mississippi.

On July 27, 2022, Hunter signed a multiyear endorsement deal with Greenwood, designed to create awareness around all that fintech has to offer to his community. He is the first NIL deal for Greenwood.

In September, he became a brand ambassador for Michael Strahan's brands.

References

External links
 Jackson State Tigers bio

Living people
American football cornerbacks
Sportspeople from West Palm Beach, Florida
People from Suwanee, Georgia
Sportspeople from the Atlanta metropolitan area
Players of American football from Florida
Players of American football from Georgia (U.S. state)
Jackson State Tigers football players
2003 births
Colorado Buffaloes football players